The Asian Age is an English-language Indian daily newspaper with editions published in Delhi, Mumbai and Kolkata. It also prints an "international edition" in London. It was launched in February 1994.

The same publishing company also produces the Deccan Chronicle.

See also 
M. J. Akbar, founder and erstwhile editor-in-chief of The Asian Age until 2013.
 T. Venkattram Reddy, editor-in-chief appointed in 2013.
Seema Mustafa, erstwhile resident editor and bureau chief of The Asian Age.

References

External links 
 
Asian Age ePaper
The Asian Age - Daily Newspaper Cover

Newspapers published in Kolkata
Newspapers published in Mumbai
English-language newspapers published in India
Publications established in 1994
1994 establishments in West Bengal
1994 establishments in Maharashtra